Elisha Taylor Baker (February 17, 1827 – August 21, 1890) was an American marine artist from New York City. He was a ship portraitist, luminist and landscape painter. Baker painted full-rigged ships, yachts, steamboats and schooners. His works are in the art collections of the New Bedford Whaling Museum, the Mariners' Museum and Park, and the Mystic Seaport Museum.

Early life

Baker was born in New York City on February 17, 1827. He is the first child of Elisha Avery Baker (1802-1859) and Laura Taylor (1806-1986). In 1832, the family moved to Colchester, Connecticut, to establish a retail fish business. By 1848, he was part owner of a 77-ton schooner Elisha A. Baker. On March 10, 1851, he married Adelaide Brigg in Hebron, Connecticut. They had no children.

Early career

Baker spent some time at sea in 1851. He worked in New York City as a marine painter from 1868-1880. He traveled around New England painting full-rigged ships, yachts, steamboats and coasting schooners. He painted some landscapes and marine artwork. One of his paintings is a John Jacob Astor IV steam yacht Nourmahal (ca. 1884) off Cowes. A business card listed him as:

Baker had two art styles of marine painting. One as a ship portraitist and the other as a luminist. He experimented with marine subjects at sunset, moonlight or in the fog. The Long Island Sound steamboat Elm City is an example of this work. He signed his paintings in various ways: "E. T. Baker", "E. Taylor Baker" "E. T. B." or "Baker". To date, a total of 24 of his paintings exist. 11 additional paintings have characteristics of his work but are unsigned. Some are unsigned because the artist painted from the shore depicting pilot boats as they came in and out of New York harbor.

A surviving circa 1875 cloth-bound sketchbook exists with 34 pages with C. & R. Poillon's shipyard, Coney Island, landscapes, battlement towers, sloop at Sheepshead Bay, ice barge, Navesink Highlands, Plumb Island, Saybrook, fishing nets drying, harbors, Brooklyn Bridge tower unfinished, cityscapes with color notations, etc.

His works are in the collections of the New Bedford Whaling Museum, the Mariners' Museum and Park, and the Mystic Seaport Museum.

List of artworks
List of works by Elisha Taylor Baker:

Death

Baker died, at age 63, on August 21, 1890, in Orange, Connecticut. He was buried at the Linwood Cemetery in Colchester, Connecticut, on August 30.

Gallery

References

External links
 

 

19th-century American painters
American male painters
American marine artists
American portrait painters
Luminism (American art style)
1827 births
1890 deaths
19th-century American male artists